Fomitopsis supina is a species of fungus in the family Fomitopsidaceae. It is a plant pathogen that affects avocados.

See also
List of avocado diseases

References

Fungi described in 1806
Fungal tree pathogens and diseases
Avocado tree diseases
supina
Taxa named by Olof Swartz